Zavydovo) is a village of approximately 1,700 people in the Mukacheve Raion of Zakarpattia Oblast (province) in western Ukraine.

Villages in Mukachevo Raion